Omate District is one of eleven districts of the province General Sánchez Cerro in Peru.

Authorities

Mayors 
 2011-2014: Angel Américo Quispitupac Soto, Somos Peru Party.
 2007-2010: Mauricio José Nina Juárez.

See also 
 Administrative divisions of Peru
 Luis Miguel Sánchez Cerro
 Q'uwa Laki

References

External links 
 Web site Omate District
 INEI Peru